The 2014 Kerrick Sports Sedan Series was an Australian motor racing competition open to Sports Sedans and Trans Am style cars. It was sanctioned by the Confederation of Australian Motor Sport as a National Series and was the eleventh National Series for Sports Sedans contested following the discontinuation of the Australian Sports Sedan Championship at the end of 2003. The 2014 series was won by Tony Ricciardello driving an Alfa Romeo GTV.

Calendar

The 2014 Kerrick Sports Sedan Series was contested over five rounds.

The results for each round were determined by the number of points scored by each driver at that round.

Classes structure
Cars competed in two classes:
 Class SS: Automobiles complying with the provisions of the CAMS Group 3D regulations for Sport Sedans.
 Class TA:  Trans Am type automobiles complying with the 2014 Sports Sedan Series Technical Regulations for Class TA.

Points system
Series points were awarded to drivers for their outright finishing positions in each race on the following basis:

Series standings
Final series standings were as follows:

Race two at Phillip Island was cancelled due to an accident and no points were awarded.

Class TA award
Reference was made in the sporting regulations regarding a Class TA award however results for this were not included with the official published series points table.

References

Kerrick Sports Sedan Series
National Sports Sedan Series